A total lunar eclipse took place on 3 March 2007, the first of two eclipses in 2007.  The moon entered the penumbral shadow at 20:18 UTC, and the umbral shadow at 21:30 UTC.  The total phase lasted between 22:44 UTC and 23:58 UTC with a distinctive brick-red shade (L=3 to L=4 on the Danjon scale).  The moon left the umbra shadow at 01:11 UTC and left the penumbra shadow at 02:24 UTC 2007-03-04. The second lunar eclipse of 2007 occurred on 28 August.

Eclipse Season 

This is the first eclipse this season.

Second eclipse this season: 19 March 2007 Partial Solar Eclipse

Lunar eclipses 

The previous lunar eclipse on 7 September 2006 was partial.

This eclipse is the first of two lunar eclipses to occur in 2007, the second being on 28 August 2007. The tables below contain detailed predictions and additional information on the Total Lunar Eclipse of 3 March 2007.

Penumbral Magnitude = 2.31882

Umbral Magnitude = 1.23280

Gamma = 0.31749

Greatest Eclipse = 03 Mar 2007 23:20:53.5 UTC (23:21:58.7 TD)

Sun right ascension = 22 hours, 57 minutes, 19.2 seconds

Sun declination = 6 degrees, 40 minutes, 46.3 seconds south of Celestial Equator

Sun diameter = 1936.0 arcseconds

Moon right ascension = 10 hours, 57 minutes, 52.2 seconds

Moon declination = 6 degrees, 56 minutes, 0.7 seconds north of Celestial Equator

Moon diameter = 1782.6 arcseconds

Earth's shadow right ascension = 10 hours, 57 minutes, 19.2 seconds

Earth's shadow declination = 6 degrees, 40 minutes, 46.3 seconds north of Celestial Equator

Totality duration = 1 hour, 13 minutes, 21.3 seconds

Umbral duration = 3 hours, 41 minutes, 5.6 seconds

Total duration = 6 hours, 5 minutes, 31.3 seconds

Viewing
The whole event was visible from Europe, Africa, parts of South America, and some areas of North America, Asia, and Western Australia. In North America, part of the event was visible at moonrise.

Map

Relation to other lunar eclipses

Eclipses of 2007 
 A total lunar eclipse on 3 March.
 A partial solar eclipse on 19 March.
 A total lunar eclipse on 28 August.
 A partial solar eclipse on 11 September.

Lunar year series

Metonic cycle (19 years)

Saros series 

It last occurred on 20 February 1989 and will next occur on 14 March 2025.

Half-Saros cycle
A lunar eclipse will be preceded and followed by solar eclipses by 9 years and 5.5 days (a half saros). This lunar eclipse is related to two total solar eclipses of Solar Saros 130.

Photo gallery

See also 
List of lunar eclipses and List of 21st-century lunar eclipses

Notes

External links 
 
 Hermit eclipse: Total lunar eclipse: March 3, 2007
NASA Saros series 123
 Photos
 Photos from the Netherlands lunar eclipse 3 March
 Flickr: Lunar Eclipse 3/3/2007: pictures of the eclipse, many of which CC-licensed, from Flickr members
 Live webcast of the total lunar eclipse 3/4 March 2007 by Astronet (The Netherlands, Belgium, Spain)
 Video of the March 3, 2007 eclipse as seen from the UK
 Lunar Eclipse 3/3/2007 
 Animated sequence
 photo

2007-03
2007 in science
March 2007 events